Park Hall Halt railway station was a station near Oswestry, Shropshire, England. The station was opened on 5 July 1926 to serve the adjoining Robert Jones and Agnes Hunt Orthopaedic Hospital near Gobowen, and closed on 7 November 1966.

In March 2021 North Shropshire MP Owen Paterson visited the site of the former Park Hall Halt, following initial discussions with Cambrian Heritage Railways regarding reopening the Oswestry to Gobowen line. He stated that the restoration of the short ½-mile section between Gobowen and Park Halt would be “unbelievably easy” to achieve, given that "You can still see the platform, the bridge looks in good order and all the track is even there."

See also
 Cambrian Heritage Railways

References

Further reading

Disused railway stations in Shropshire
Railway stations in Great Britain opened in 1926
Railway stations in Great Britain closed in 1966
Former Great Western Railway stations